Attrition warfare is a military strategy consisting of belligerent attempts to win a war by wearing down the enemy to the point of collapse through continuous losses in personnel and material. The word attrition comes from the Latin root , meaning "to rub against", similar to the "grinding down" of the opponent's forces in attrition warfare.

Strategic considerations
Attrition warfare represents an attempt to grind down an opponent's ability to make war by destroying their military resources by any means including guerrilla warfare, people's war, scorched earth and all kind of battles apart from a decisive battle. Attrition warfare does not include all kinds of Blitzkrieg or using concentration of force and a decisive battle to win. The side that reinforces their army at a higher speed will normally win the war. Clausewitz called it the exhaustion of the adversary.

A side that perceives itself to be at a marked disadvantage may deliberately seek out attrition warfare to neutralize its opponent's advantages over time. Sun Tzu has stated, that there is no country that has benefitted from prolonged warfare, but Russia in 1812 won the war with attrition warfare against Napoleon. When attritional methods have worn down the enemy sufficiently to make other methods feasible, attritional methods are often complemented or even abandoned by other strategies. But in World War I military commanders on both sides relied on attrition warfare resulting in terrible casualties without a strategic result.

The difference between war of attrition and other forms of war is somewhat artificial since even a single battle normally contains an element of attrition. One can be said to pursue a strategy of attrition if one makes it the main goal to cause gradual attrition to the opponent eventually amounting to unacceptable or unsustainable levels for the opponent while limiting one's own gradual losses to acceptable and sustainable levels. That should be seen as opposed to other main goals such as the conquest of some resource or territory or an attempt to cause the enemy great losses in a single stroke (such as by encirclement and capture). Attrition warfare also tries to increase the friction in a war for the opponent.

Examples in history

Most typical

The French invasion of Russia is a textbook example how elements of attrition warfare interfered with Napoleon's military logistics and won the war without a decisive battle. One of the best visual representations of the Russian attrition warfare strategies was created by Charles Joseph Minard. It shows the steady decrease of the number of soldiers of the French Grande Armée during the course of the war.

Best known

The best-known example of attrition warfare might be on the Western Front during World War I. Both military forces found themselves in static defensive positions in trenches running from Switzerland to the English Channel. For years, without any opportunity for maneuvers, the only way the commanders thought that they could defeat the enemy was to repeatedly attack head on and grind the other down.

One of the most enduring examples of attrition warfare on the Western Front is the Battle of Verdun, which took place throughout most of 1916. Erich von Falkenhayn later claimed that his tactics at Verdun were designed not to take the city but rather to destroy the French Army in its defense. Falkenhayn is described as wanting to "bleed France white" and thus the attrition tactics were employed in the battle.

Soldiers on the Italian Front fought a series of battles of attrition along the Isonzo River between June 1915 and November 1917.

Attritional warfare in World War I has been shown by historians such as Hew Strachan to have been used as a post hoc ergo propter hoc excuse for failed offensives. Contemporary sources disagree with Strachan's view on this. While the Christmas Memorandum is a post-war invention, the strategy of attritional warfare was the original strategy for the battle.

Most unusual
An example in which attritional warfare was stumbled into without intent occurred during the latter part of the American Civil War, when Union general Ulysses S. Grant continually attempted to force the Army of Northern Virginia into a decisive engagement in the open, but was prevented from doing so by the quick repositioning and refortification by Robert E. Lee. Due to this, the Army of the Potomac was forced to attempt to dislodge its counterpart with direct attacks against entrenched positions on numerous occasions.

While these did not yield the breakthrough that Grant had hoped for, and the Union casualties were higher by volume as a result, the Union was able to replenish its forces more readily, and the Confederacy began taking a higher percentage of casualties compared to its overall capacity. By the time Grant finally forced Lee into an open engagement at the Battle of Appomattox Court House, the Army of Northern Virginia was unable to mount an effective counterattack against a fraction of the Union army, and subsequently surrendered.

List of wars

 Scythian tactics during the European Scythian campaign of Darius I of 513 BC, which was in deep steppes retreat, avoiding a direct confrontation with Darius I's army, while spoiling the wells and pastures.
 The Athenians, who were weaker in land warfare during the Peloponnesian War, employed attrition warfare using their navy.
 The "delaying" tactics of Quintus Fabius Maximus Verrucosus (surnamed "Cunctator", the delayer) against Hannibal during the Second Punic War.
 Muhammad Tapar's campaign against the Nizaris of Alamut in 1109–1118
 Second Mongol invasion of Hungary in 1285 and 1286
 Fall of Tenochtitlan by Hernán Cortés in 1521
 Swedish invasion of Russia in 1708
 The American strategy during the American Revolutionary War
 The latter portion of the American Civil War, notably the siege of Vicksburg, the overland campaign, and the siege of Petersburg
 The Attrition warfare against Napoleon in the French invasion of Russia by Napoleon Bonaparte in 1812
 The latter stages of the Spanish Civil War (1938–1939)
 The Chinese strategy during the Second Sino-Japanese War
 Tonnage war in the Atlantic and Pacific during World War II
 The Air battle for Great Britain in World War II after the bombing of London
 Static battles in World War II, including Soviet urban defense during the Battle of Stalingrad
 Battle of Tabu-dong, and the final two years of the Korean War
 The Vietnam War (Body count)
 The "Long War" during the Provisional IRA's armed campaign against the British Army during the Troubles.
 The Israeli–Egyptian War of Attrition from 1967 to 1970.
 The Soviet–Afghan War
 The later phases of the Iran–Iraq War
 The Yugoslav Wars (1991-2001): especially the Bosnian War (1992-1995), the Croatian War (1991-1992 and 1995), and the Kosovo War (1998-1999).
 The War in Afghanistan (2001–2021)
 The Sri Lankan Civil War after 2005
 The 2011 Libyan civil war
 Kurdish–Turkish conflict (1978–present)
 The Syrian Civil War (2011–present), in particular the Battle of Aleppo.
 The fight of the Polisario Front in Western Sahara against the Moroccan Army (2020–present).
 During the 2022 Russian invasion of Ukraine, the Russian military adopted a strategy of attrition.

See also
 Asymmetric warfare
 Guerrilla warfare
 Human wave attack
 Mexican standoff
 No-win situation
 Pyrrhic victory
 Winner's curse
 Win-win game

Military theory
 Fabian strategy
 Flypaper theory (strategy)
 Ivan Bloch
 Lanchester's laws
 Loss Exchange Ratio
 Maneuver warfare
 New generation warfare
(19th century)

Notes

References
 
 
 
 
 
 
 
 
 
 
 
 

 
Military strategy
Wars by type
Warfare by type